Poland sent a delegation to compete at the 1976 Summer Paralympics in Toronto, Canada. Its athletes finished seventh in the overall medal count.

See also 
 1976 Summer Paralympics
 Poland at the 1976 Summer Olympics

References 

Nations at the 1976 Summer Paralympics
1976
Summer Paralympics